Novel ecosystems are human-built, modified, or engineered niches of the Anthropocene. They exist in places that have been altered in structure and function by human agency. Novel ecosystems are part of the human environment and niche (including urban, suburban, and rural), they lack natural analogs, and they have extended an influence that has converted more than three-quarters of wild Earth. These anthropogenic biomes include technoecosystems that are fuelled by powerful energy sources (fossil and nuclear) including ecosystems populated with technodiversity, such as roads and unique combinations of soils called technosols. Vegetation associations on old buildings or along field boundary stone walls in old agricultural landscapes are examples of sites where research into novel ecosystem ecology is developing.

Overview

Human society has transformed the planet to such an extent that we may have ushered in a new epoch known as the anthropocene. The ecological niche of the anthropocene contains entirely novel ecosystems that include technosols, technodiversity, anthromes, and the technosphere. These terms describe the human ecological phenomena marking this unique turn in the evolution of Earth's history. The total human ecosystem (or anthrome) describes the relationship of the industrial technosphere to the ecosphere.

Technoecosystems interface with natural life-supporting ecosystems in competitive and parasitic ways.
 Odum (2001)  attributes this term to a 1982 publication by Zev Naveh: "Current urban-industrial society not only impacts natural life-support ecosystems, but also has created entirely new arrangements that we can call techno-ecosystems, a term believed to be first suggested by Zev Neveh (1982). These new systems involve new, powerful energy sources (fossil and atomic fuels), technology, money, and cities that have little or no parallels in nature." The term technoecosystem, however, appears earliest in print in a 1976 technical report and also appears in a book chapter (see  in Lamberton and Thomas (1982) written by Kenneth E. Boulding).

Novel Ecosystems

Novel ecosystems "differ in composition and/or function from present and past systems". Novel ecosystems are the hallmark of the recently proposed anthropocene epoch. They have no natural analogs due to human alterations on global climate systems, invasive species, a global mass extinction, and disruption of the global nitrogen cycle. Novel ecosystems are creating many different kinds of dilemmas for terrestrial and marine conservation biologists. On a more local scale, abandoned lots, agricultural land, old buildings, field boundary stone walls or residential gardens provide study sites on the history and dynamics of ecology in novel ecosystems.

Anthropogenic biomes

Ellis (2008) identifies twenty-one different kinds of anthropogenic biomes that sort into the following groups: 1) dense settlements, 2) villages, 3) croplands, 4) rangeland, 5) forested, and 6) wildlands. These anthropogenic biomes (or anthromes for short) create the technosphere that surrounds us and are populated with diverse technologies (or technodiversity for short). Within these anthromes the human species (one species out of billions) appropriates 23.8% of the global net primary production. "This is a remarkable impact on the biosphere caused by just one species."

Noosphere

Noosphere (sometimes noösphere) is the "sphere of human thought". The word is derived from the Greek νοῦς (nous "mind") + σφαῖρα  (sphaira "sphere"), in lexical analogy to "atmosphere" and "biosphere". Introduced by Pierre Teilhard de Chardin 1922  in his Cosmogenesis". Another possibility is the first use of the term by Édouard Le Roy, who together with Chardin was listening to lectures of Vladimir Vernadsky at Sorbonne. In 1936 Vernadsky presented on the idea of the Noosphere in a letter to  Boris Leonidovich Lichkov (though, he states that the concept derives from Le Roy).

Technosphere
The technosphere is the part of the environment on Earth where technodiversity extends its influence into the biosphere. "For the development of suitable restoration strategies, a clear distinction has to be made between different functional classes of natural and cultural solar-powered biosphere and fossil-powered technosphere landscapes, according to their inputs and throughputs of energy and materials, their organisms, their control by natural or human information, their internal self-organization and their regenerative capacities." The weight of Earth's technosphere has been calculated as 30 trillion tons, a mass greater than 50 kilos for every square metre of the planet's surface.

Technoecosystems
The concept of technoecosystems has been pioneered by ecologists Howard T. Odum and Zev Naveh. Technoecosystems interface with and are competitive toward natural systems. They have advanced technology (or technodiversity) money-based market economies and have a large ecological footprints.  Technoecosystems have far greater energy requirements than natural ecosystems, excessive water consumption, and release toxic and eutrophicating chemicals. Other ecologists have defined the extensive global network of road systems as a type of technoecosystem.

Technoecotypes
"Bio-agro- and techno-ecotopes are spatially integrated in larger, regional landscape units, but they are not structurally and functionally integrated in the ecosphere. Because of the adverse impacts of the latter and the great human pressures on bio-ecotopes, they are even antagonistically related and therefore cannot function together as a coherent, sustainable ecological system."

Technosols

Technosols are a new form of ground group in the World Reference Base for Soil Resources (WRB). Technosols are " mainly characterised by anthropogenic parent material of organic and mineral nature and which origin can be either natural or technogenic."

Technodiversity
Technodiversity refers to the varied diversity of technological artifacts that exist in technoecosystems.

References

Ecology
Systems ecology